The London-based Printmakers Council, founded in 1965, aims to promote the art of printmaking (through providing information, encouraging co-operation and holding exhibitions) and the work of contemporary printmakers. Their office is situated in Bermondsey, London. Membership is open to artists, students and interested individuals as friends.

One of the founding members and a Chairman in 1981-1983 was Agathe Sorel, a London-based artist of Hungarian descent, specializing in painting, sculpture and printmaking.

Exhibitions 
The first Annual Printmakers Council Exhibition was held at the Grabowski Gallery, London from December 1966 to January 1967, with a concurrent exhibition at the AAA Gallery in New York. London venues the Printmakers Council has organised exhibitions at include the Natural History Museum, Battersea Pumphouse, Bankside Gallery, Barbican Library, The National Theatre, The Mall Galleries. Internationally there have been exhibitions and the Musée Adzak in Paris, and exchanges with Landau, Germany and the Printmakers of Western Australia.

Honorary members 
Allen Jones, Graham Sutherland and John Piper have been either members or honorary members. Recent Honorary members include Anne Desmet, Peter Ford, David Hockney and Gill Saunders.

References

Further reading 
 Making an Impression: Printmakers Council at 50, 2015, Imprimata, hardback, 264 pages,

External links 
 Printmakers Council
 Information from EURAN — European Art Networks

1965 establishments in England
Cultural organisations based in London
Arts councils of the United Kingdom
Printmaking groups and organizations
Professional associations based in the United Kingdom
Arts organizations established in 1965
Arts organisations based in England
English contemporary art